Hydroxycarboxylic acid receptor 2 (HCA2), also known as niacin receptor 1 (NIACR1) and GPR109A, is a protein which in humans is encoded by the HCAR2 gene. HCA2, like the other hydroxycarboxylic acid receptors HCA1 and HCA3, is a Gi/o-coupled G protein-coupled receptor (GPCR). The primary endogenous agonists of HCA2 are -β-hydroxybutyric acid and butyric acid (and their conjugate bases, β-hydroxybutyrate and butyrate). HCA2 is also a high-affinity biomolecular target for niacin (aka nicotinic acid).

HCA2 activation inhibits lipolytic and atherogenic activity (i.e., it inhibits the breakdown of fats and the development of atherosclerosis), induces vasodilation (i.e., the dilation of blood vessels), and is responsible for mediating niacin-induced flushing.

Function 
HCA2 is a high-affinity Gi/Go-coupled G protein-coupled receptor (GPCR) for nicotinic acid (niacin), and is a member of the nicotinic acid receptor family of GPCRs. HCA2 activation inhibits lipolytic and atherogenic activity (i.e., it inhibits the breakdown of fats and the development of atherosclerosis), induces vasodilation (i.e., the dilation of blood vessels), and is responsible for niacin-induced flushing.

5-oxo-ETE 
The mouse ortholog of HCA2, Niacr1, has been proposed to mediate the ability of 5-oxo-ETE, a member of the 5-HETE family of eicosanoids, to stimulate the production of steroidogenic acute regulatory protein mRNA, Steroidogenic acute regulatory protein, and thereby progesterone in mouse cultured MA-10 Leydig cells.  Human tissues respond to 5-oxo-ETE and other 5-HETE family members though the OXER1 G protein-coupled receptor. The roles, if any, of Niacr1 in the response of leydig cells to other 5-HETE family members, of Niacr1 in the response of other mouse cells to 5-HETE family members, and the role of HCA2 in the response of human tissues to 5-HETE family members has not been determined.

Clinical significance 
HCA2 is an important biomolecular target of niacin which is a widely prescribed drug for the treatment of dyslipidemia and to increase HDL cholesterol but whose therapeutic use is limited by flushing. In HCA2 knockout mice, the effects of niacin on both lipids and flushing is eliminated.  Furthermore, in arrestin beta 1 knockout mice, niacin's effect on flushing is greatly reduced while the lipid modifying effects are maintained. At high doses, niacin produces marked anti-inflammatory effects in a variety of tissues – including the brain, gastrointestinal tract, skin, and vascular tissue – through activation of HCA2. Niacin has also been shown to attenuate neuroinflammation in part through NIACR1 binding; consequently, HCA2 has been identified as a potential therapeutic target for treating neuroimmune disorders such as multiple sclerosis and Parkinson's disease.

The precise mechanism of action of niacin therapeutic effects has not been fully elucidated, but appears to work in part through activation of HCA2 which reduces the levels of intracellular cAMP thereby inhibiting lipolysis in adipocytes.  In contrast, the flushing effect is due to HCA2 activation of ERK 1/2 MAP kinase mediated by arrestin beta 1. Activation of MAP kinase in turn causes release of prostaglandin D2 from Langerhans cells in the skin.

NIACR1 is essential for the anti-inflammatory effect of beta-hydroxybutyrate in many cell types, but the inhibition of the NLRP3 inflammasome by beta-hydroxybutyrate in macrophages is independent of NIACR1.

Ligands
Full agonists of HCA2 include:
 -β-Hydroxybutyric acid and β-hydroxybutyrate
 Butyric acid and butyrate
 Niacin (also known as nicotinic acid, a form of vitamin B3)

References 

G protein-coupled receptors